A Flat for Three (Italian: Posti in piedi in paradiso) is a 2012 Italian comedy film directed by Carlo Verdone. The film won three Nastro d'Argento Awards, for best comedy film, best actress (Micaela Ramazzotti) and best supporting actor (Marco Giallini). The film was a box office success, grossing over 9 million euros.

Plot 
In Italy burden of the economic crisis three men in Rome: Ulisse, Fulvio and Domenico decide to rent an apartment together in order to live with their modest work. However the three encounter any difficulties that have forced them to always be one step away from starvation. Ulisse has to maintain his wife and daughter selling recordings of important foreign singers, Fulvio has the task of reviewing silly scandals of celebrities instead of writing articles for major artists, while Domenico must keep his wife and children going to make love with old single pensioners. At the end of the story the three, despite all the difficulties, able to have a little luck in their lives.

Cast 

 Carlo Verdone: Ulisse Diamanti  
 Pierfrancesco Favino: Fulvio Brignola
 Marco Giallini: Domenico Segato 
 Micaela Ramazzotti: Gloria 
 Diane Fleri: Claire 
 Nicoletta Romanoff: Lorenza  
 Maria Luisa De Crescenzo: Agnese
 Tezeta Abraham: Girl in the dream

References

External links

2012 films
Italian comedy films
Films directed by Carlo Verdone
2012 comedy films
2010s Italian-language films
2010s Italian films